Arthur Morrison (22 November 1846 – 21 November 1901) was a member of parliament in Dunedin, New Zealand.

Early life
Morrison was born in Darvel, Ayrshire, Scotland, in 1846 and attended the local parish school until aged nine years.  He emigrated to New Zealand in 1874 and was a coal merchant in Dunedin from 1875 until his election to Parliament in 1893. He exemplified the self-made man who identified with Labour.

Political career

 
 
 

Morrison served on the Caversham Borough Council for three years. The Otago Daily Times said Morrison was a "careful reasoner".

He represented the Caversham electorate in the New Zealand House of Representatives from the 1893 general election to his death in 1901.

From 1900 until 1901 he was the Liberal Party's junior whip.

Death
Morrison died in Hanmer Springs on 21 November 1901. It was the largest funeral that has ever been witnessed in Caversham.

Notes

References

|-

1846 births
1901 deaths
New Zealand Liberal Party MPs
Local politicians in New Zealand
New Zealand businesspeople
Businesspeople in coal
Scottish emigrants to New Zealand
New Zealand MPs for Dunedin electorates
Members of the New Zealand House of Representatives
People from East Ayrshire
Burials at Dunedin Southern Cemetery
19th-century New Zealand politicians